One Crazy Weekend is the debut collaborative studio album by American emcee/producer duo Young Zee and Mr. Green.

Track listing 

Sample credits
 "Those Dayz" sampled "Back In The Day" by Ahmad (1994)
 "Ooh I'm Telling" sampled "Let Me Be" by Parliament (1975)
 "Weird" sampled "Venus" by Air (2003)
 "Hometown" sampled "Hometown Glory" by Adele (2007) and "Amen, Brother" by The Winstons (1969)

Personnel 
 Aaron Green – producer (tracks 1-9)
 Brian Bostic – guest rapper (track 12)
 Dewayne Battle – main rapper, producer (tracks 10-11)
 Jerome Derek Hinds, Jr. – guest rapper (track 12)
 Krash Battle – guest rapper (track 3)
 Larry Cooper – guest rapper (track 11)
 Michael Scharf – artwork
 Rashia Tashan Fisher – guest rapper (track 12)
 Shakir Nur-al-din Abdullah – guest rapper (track 12)

References

External links 
 

2012 albums
Outsidaz albums